Johanna Larsson and Yvonne Meusburger were the defending champions, but chose not to compete.

Irina-Camelia Begu and Nina Bratchikova defeated Laura-Ioana Andrei and Mădălina Gojnea in the final 6–2, 6–2.

Seeds

Draw

References 
 Main draw

Open GDF Suez de Marseille - Doubles